An aliyah (Hebrew עליה, or aliya and other variant English spellings) is the calling of a member of a Jewish congregation up to the bimah for a segment of the formal Torah reading.

The person who receives the aliyah goes up to the bimah before the reading and recites a blessing for reading of the Torah. After the portion of the Torah is read, the recipient recites another blessing. In many congregations, the recipient will stand to the side of the bimah during the next person's reading.

Process
A synagogue official, called a gabbai, calls up several people (men in Orthodox and some Conservative congregations, or both men and women in others), in turn, to be honored with an aliyah (pl. עליות, aliyot; "ascent" or "going up"). The honoree (or, more usually, a designated reader) recites a blessing over the Torah, between each verse. Each reads a section of the day's Torah portion. There are always at least three olim (people called to read the Torah) unless a Kohen is present and no Levite is present, in which case the Kohen is called for the first and second reading:
Initially, the Torah was read on the Sabbath or special occasions by the king, a prophet, or a kohen. In time, distinguished people were called to read portions of the Torah. The Torah was on a platform to which the reader ascended, hence the Hebrew term aliyah ("going up"). Eventually, the rabbis ordained that a professional reader do the reading to avoid embarrassing those who were unable to read the Torah script (Shabbat 11a). There are seven aliyot on a Sabbath (Megillah 21a). Bet Yoseph quotes a geonic source in explanation of this number (Ein Pochasim, Tur, Hilchot Shabbat 282). In the event that someone missed an entire week's services and as a result had not responded to the reader's daily invocation of Barechu, he may make up for it by responding to the Barechu of the seven blessings of the aliyot. A more acceptable reason is the midrashic explanation for the seven benedictions on the Sabbath (in place of the eighteen). The seven benedictions correspond to the seven voices of God (kol) mentioned in the Twenty-ninth Psalm and again in connection with the giving of the Torah (beginning with Exodus 19:16, Midrash Yelamdenu). This explanation is equally applicable to the seven aliyot. 

The first aliyah is assigned to a kohen and the second to a levi. This order was ordained to avoid public competition for the honor of being first (Gittin 59b). Babylonian Jewry completed the reading of the Torah within one year. Palestinian Jewry adopted a triennial cycle (Megillah 29b). The reading of a selection from the Prophets originated in the time of the Mishnah (Megillah 24a). This practice probably began after the canonization of the Bible and the ensuing effort by Jews to highlight the Prophets.

Number of aliyot per day

On Saturday mornings, there are seven olim, the maximum of any day, but more may be added if desired, by subdividing these seven aliyot or repeating passages (according to the custom of some communities). When a festival or Yom Kippur coincides with Shabbat the readings are divided into seven aliyot instead of five or six.

In most congregations, the oleh does not themself read the Torah aloud. Rather, they stand near it while a practiced expert, called a ba'al k'ri'ah ("one in charge of reading"; sometimes ba'al ko're), reads the Torah, with cantillation, for the congregation. In some congregations the oleh follows along with the expert, reading in a whisper. In Yemenite communities, the oleh reads the portion themself, while another person, usually a young boy, recites the Targum after each verse.

The first aliyah 

According to Orthodox Judaism, the first oleh (person called to read) is a kohen and the second a levi; the remaining olim are yisr'elim — Jews who are neither kohen nor levi. (This assumes that such people are available; there are rules in place for what is done if they are not.) The first two aliyot are referred to as "Kohen" and "Levi," while the rest are known by their number (in Hebrew). This practice is also followed in some but not all Conservative synagogues. Reform and Reconstructionist Judaism have abolished special ritual roles for the descendants of the Biblical priestly and levitical castes.

Each oleh, after being called to the Torah, approaches it, recites a benediction, a portion is read, and the 'oleh' concludes with another benediction. Then the next oleh is called.

The gabbai recites a Hebrew verse upon calling the first person to the Torah. After that, men are called with:
"Ya'amod (Let him arise),
[Hebrew Name] ben (son of) [Father's Hebrew name] [Ha-Kohen (the Kohen) / Ha-Levi (the Levite)]
(the name of the Aliyah in Hebrew)." In synagogues where women may receive aliyot, women are called with "Ta'amod (Let her arise),
[Hebrew Name] bat (daughter of) [Father's Hebrew name] [Ha-Kohen (the Kohen) / Ha-Levi (the Levite)](the name of the Aliyah in Hebrew)."

These aliyot are followed by half-kaddish. When the Torah is read in the afternoon, kaddish is not recited at this point, but rather after the Torah has been returned to the Ark.

Simchat Torah
On Simchat Torah, the tradition is that all members of the congregation are called for an aliyah during the Shacharit service. There are various ways in which this is accomplished. In some congregations, this is done by repeating the first five readings of V'Zot HaBerachah until everyone receives an aliyah. In others, this is done by reading each section only once while calling groups for each aliyah. The final regular aliyah is known as Kol HaNe'arim, in which minor children (under Bar/Bat Mitzvah age) are called for a joint aliyah.

Including women
In 1955, the Committee on Jewish Law and Standards authorized women to have an aliyah at Torah-reading services.

COVID 19 response in summer 2020
In order to practice social distancing to limit the number of individuals on the bimah as congregations reopened during 2020 in later stages that year of the COVID-19 pandemic, Orthodox Union guidelines suggested that the person reading the Torah take all three aliyot.

Non-gendered language
In 2022, the Committee on Jewish Law and Standards, the halakhic authority for the Conservative movement, authorized non-gendered language for the aliyah, and the honors of the hagbah (lifting the Torah) and the gelilah (rolling up the Torah). They also authorized non-gendered language for calling up Cohens and Levis (descendants of the tribe of Levi) as well as a way to address people without gendered language during the prayer Mi Shebeirach.

References

External links 
 Kohen, don't give up that first aliyah Kehuna.org

Torah reading